Martha Carolina Acosta Zárate (born September 30, 1962 in Concepción, Junín) is a Peruvian politician and a Congresswoman representing Junín for the 2006–2011 term. Acosta belongs to the Union for Peru party.

References

External links 

Official Congressional Site

1962 births
Living people
People from Junín Region
Union for Peru politicians
Members of the Congress of the Republic of Peru
21st-century Peruvian women politicians
21st-century Peruvian politicians
Women members of the Congress of the Republic of Peru